Attic Records may refer to:

 Attic Records (Canada), Canadian rock label
 ATIC Records, Manchester, United Kingdom electronic / Hip Hop label, founded by Aim in 2005